Goranlı (also, Goranly) is a village and municipality in the Goranboy District of Azerbaijan. It has a population of 553. The municipality consists of the villages of Goranly and Gazanchy.

References 

Populated places in Goranboy District